Narva is officially divided into 15 neighborhoods which carry no administrative purpose. Their names and borders are defined as follows: Elektrijaama, Joaoru, Kalevi, Kerese, Kreenholmi, Kudruküla, Kulgu, Olgina, Paemurru, Pähklimäe, Siivertsi, Soldina, Sutthoffi, Vanalinn, and Veekulgu.

Elektrijaama

Elektrijaama is the biggest neighbourhood of Narva.

Joaoru

Kalevi

Kerese

Kreenholmi

Kudruküla

Kulgu

Olgina

Paemurru

Pähklimäe

Siivertsi

Soldina

Sutthoffi

Vanalinn

Veekulgu

References

Narva